The 2011 NBA playoffs was the postseason tournament of the National Basketball Association's 2010–11 season. The tournament concluded with the Western Conference champion Dallas Mavericks defeating the Eastern Conference champion Miami Heat 4 games to 2 in the NBA Finals. Dirk Nowitzki was named NBA Finals MVP.

Overview

Western Conference
The San Antonio Spurs entered their fourteenth consecutive postseason. They also entered as the top seed in the Western Conference for the first time since 2006, in addition to entering the postseason with 50+ regular season wins for the twelfth consecutive season.

The two time defending champions, the Los Angeles Lakers entered their sixth consecutive postseason. However, this would be their first since 2007 without posting the top seed in the Western Conference.

The Dallas Mavericks entered their eleventh consecutive postseason, and their eleventh straight appearance having won 50+ games in the regular season.

The Oklahoma City Thunder entered the playoffs with their first Northwest Division title under this incarnation.

The Portland Trail Blazers entered their third consecutive postseason.

The New Orleans Hornets also returned to the playoffs for the third time in four seasons. However, this was also their final postseason appearance before the franchise was renamed the Pelicans before the 2013–14 season. They lost in the first round to the Los Angeles Lakers in six games, and would not return to the playoffs until 2015.

The Memphis Grizzlies also made the playoffs for the first time since 2006. Unlike their previous three appearances, in which they were swept in the first round, The Grizzlies broke their trend by winning Game 1 of their series against the Spurs, their first playoff win in franchise history.

The Phoenix Suns, despite a run to the Western Conference Finals last postseason, missed the playoffs for the second time in three seasons. This would also mark the start of a ten season postseason drought for the Suns.

The Utah Jazz missed the playoffs for the first time since 2006.

Eastern Conference
The Chicago Bulls achieved several "firsts" since 1998: the East's best record, a Central Division title, and over 60 victories. They also clinched the NBA's best record for the first time since 1997, guaranteeing home-court advantage throughout the playoffs.

The Miami Heat entered their third consecutive postseason, and their first in the Big 3 era of Dwyane Wade, LeBron James, and Chris Bosh. They would also open the playoffs at home for the first time since 2006. Their in-state rivals, the Orlando Magic, entered their fifth consecutive postseason. In addition, for the first time, both franchises would open their playoff runs at home.

The New York Knicks made the playoffs for the first time since 2004, but this was their first playoff appearance as an above-.500 team since 2001. However, they were swept by the Boston Celtics in the first round.

The Philadelphia 76ers appeared for the third time in four seasons. However, they lost in the first round to the Miami Heat. 

The Indiana Pacers made the playoffs for the first time since 2006, despite posting a sub .500 record. However, they lost to the Chicago Bulls in the first round.

First Round
By losing Game 1 of their series against the New Orleans Hornets, the Los Angeles Lakers joined the San Antonio Spurs as the first top seeds to lose an opening game of the playoffs since the 16-team playoff format was introduced.

In Game 1 of the first round series between the Orlando Magic and Atlanta Hawks Dwight Howard of the Orlando Magic tied a franchise record with 46 points (31 in the first half), tying Tracy McGrady's total in Game 2 of the 2003 First Round against the Detroit Pistons.

In Game 4 of their first round series against the Dallas Mavericks, the Portland Trail Blazers overcame a 23 point deficit to tie the series at 2. However, the Mavericks would go on to win the series in six games, giving the Trail Blazers their sixth consecutive first round series loss. They would not return to the playoffs until 2014.

With their first round win over the Denver Nuggets, the Oklahoma City Thunder won their first playoff series since relocating from Seattle. This also marked the first playoff series win for Kevin Durant.

With their first round sweep of the New York Knicks, the Boston Celtics swept a best-of-7 playoff series for the first time since winning the 1986 Eastern Conference Finals with a 4-game sweep of the Bucks; prior to the series win they had not swept a series overall since 1992, in Larry Bird's final season. However, they lost to the Miami Heat in the conference semifinals.

With their first round series victory over the Philadelphia 76ers, the Miami Heat won their first playoff series since 2006, when they last won the NBA Championship. It also marked the first playoff series win for Erik Spoelstra as a head coach.

With their first round series win over the Indians Pacers, the Chicago Bulls won their first playoff series since 2007.

In Game 6 of their first round series against the San Antonio Spurs, the Memphis Grizzlies followed up their first playoff win by winning their first playoff series. They became the fourth eighth seeded team to beat a top seeded team in the first round, and the second team to do so since the first round expanded to a best-of-seven format in 2003. The Golden State Warriors were the most recent team to accomplish this feat.

With their series loss to the Atlanta Hawks, the Orlando Magic became the first team coached by Stan Van Gundy to lose a first round playoff series.

For the first time since the current NBA Playoff format was introduced in 2003, no first-round series was pushed to a Game 7.

Conference Semifinals
The Los Angeles Lakers and the Dallas Mavericks met in the playoffs for the first time since 1988. It also marked the first and only postseason meeting between Kobe Bryant and Dirk Nowitzki. The series was extremely notable for the following reasons.
 Game 1: The Dallas Mavericks overcame a 16 point fourth quarter deficit to win the game.
 Game 2: The Los Angeles Lakers lost the first two games of a playoff series at home.
 Game 3: The Los Angeles Lakers blew a 7 point fourth quarter lead to lose 92-98.
 Game 4
 The Dallas Mavericks set an NBA record with 20 three pointers (with Jason Terry shooting nine of them).
 Andrew Bynum and Lamar Odom getting ejected 45 seconds apart
 With a 122-86 victory, the Dallas Mavericks not only swept the Los Angeles Lakers, but they also made the Conference Finals for the first time since 2006 (and fourth overall), and vindicated themselves following their shocking first round exit four years earlier. 
 This was also Phil Jackson’s final NBA game as a head coach. 
 Their series loss to the Dallas Mavericks marked the Los Angeles Lakers’ first series loss despite having home court advantage since 1996. It also marked Phil Jackson’s first time being swept in a playoff series.

Game 4 of the Heat-Celtics series was Shaquille O’Neal’s final NBA game, as he would announce his retirement during the 2011 NBA Finals. It also marked the second time (the first being 2007) that his and Kobe Bryant’s teams were eliminated in the same playoff series since the duo broke up in 2004.

With their conference semifinals win over the Atlanta Hawks, the Chicago Bulls returned to the Conference Finals for the first time since 1998, when they last made the NBA Finals.

Game 7 of the Grizzlies–Thunder series also ensured a 12th straight postseason with at least one Game 7 played. The last without one was the 1999 NBA playoffs. The 2011 Playoffs also marked the first time since 2007 that only one series went to a Game 7. That would not happen again until 2022. By winning this game, the Oklahoma City Thunder made their first Western Conference Finals appearance since 1996 (when they were known as the Seattle SuperSonics), and their first under the current incarnation.

Conference Finals
For the first time since 2007, no #1 or #2 seed participated in the Western Conference Finals.

With their Western Conference Finals series win over the Oklahoma City Thunder, the Dallas Mavericks returned to the NBA Finals for the first time since 2006.

With their Eastern Conference Finals series win over the Chicago Bulls, the Miami Heat returned to the NBA Finals for the first time since 2006, guaranteeing an NBA Finals rematch with the Dallas Mavericks. It also marked the first time since 1990 that the Chicago Bulls lost an Eastern Conference Finals series, and the first time since 1989 that the Bulls lost the ECF at home. As of 2023, the this was the Bulls’ most recent Eastern Conference Finals appearance.

NBA Finals
In a rematch of the 2006 NBA Finals, there were some extremely notable moments.
 Game 2: The Dallas Mavericks came back from a fifteen point deficit to win the game, 95-93. Ironically enough, they held a nine point lead in the first half before falling behind in the second half. LeBron James only scored 2 points in the final quarter.
 Game 4: LeBron James scored 0 points in the fourth quarter as the Dallas Mavericks went on to win the game 86-83. Dirk Nowitzki, on the other hand, played despite having a fever.
 Game 5: LeBron James scored only 2 points for the third time in four games, allowing the Dallas Mavericks to take a 3-2 series lead back to Miami.
 Game 6: With the win, the Dallas Mavericks defeated the Miami Heat in six games to win the championship. The Dallas Mavericks also became the first team in NBA History to win the NBA Finals despite trailing 1-0 and 2-1 in the same finals series. Dirk Nowitzki, despite shooting 1 for 12 in the first half of the game, was Finals MVP. The Mavericks would not win another playoff series until 2022.

Format

The 3 division winners and 5 other teams with the most wins from each conference qualified for the playoffs. The seedings are based on each team's record. However, a division champion is guaranteed to be ranked at least fourth, regardless of their record and their winnings.

Tiebreak procedures
The tiebreakers that determined seedings were:
Division leader wins tie against team not leading a division
Head-to-head record
Division record (if all tied teams are in the same division)
Conference record
Record vs. playoff teams, own conference (top 8 of the conference east/west) (including tied teams)
Record vs. playoff teams, other conference (top 8 of the conference east/west) (including tied teams) (this tiebreaker does not apply if 3 or more tied teams)
Point differential, all games

Playoff qualifying

Eastern Conference

Western Conference

— = Did not achieve

Notes

Bracket
Teams in bold advanced to the next round. The numbers to the left of each team indicate the team's seeding in its conference, and the numbers to the right indicate the number of games the team won in that round. The division champions are marked by an asterisk. Home court advantage for the playoffs does not necessarily belong to the higher-seeded team, but instead the team with the better regular season record; teams with home court advantage are shown in italics. If two teams with same record met in a round use normal tiebreakers. Tiebreakers in NBA Finals are head-to-head and record vs opposite conference.

First round
All times are in Eastern Daylight Time (UTC−4)

Eastern Conference first round

(1) Chicago Bulls vs. (8) Indiana Pacers

Regular-season series

This was the second playoff meeting between these two teams, with the Bulls winning the first meeting.

This series pitted the team with the best record in the regular season against the team with the worst record in the playoffs.   As such this series was expected to be a very easy one for the Bulls.  However, despite the Bulls winning 4-1 the series was much closer than this figure would indicate.  Except for the last game each was heavily contested with each of the first 4 being decided by 6 points or less.  The series could have easily gone 6 or 7 games had the Pacers been able to convert in the end of game situations in each of the first 3 games.  However, despite their struggles the Bulls were able to take the series and advance to the Eastern Conference Semifinals for the second time since the Michael Jordan era (they advanced to the Eastern Conference Semifinals in 2007).

(2) Miami Heat vs. (7) Philadelphia 76ers

Regular-season series

This was the first playoff meeting between the Heat and the 76ers.

The newly revamped Heat, with the much publicized acquisition of all stars and franchise players LeBron James and Chris Bosh during the off-season, were heavy favorites going into this series against the Philadelphia 76ers. Along with Dwyane Wade, James and Bosh comprised the "Big 3", and were eager to show critics that they were a team that could compete in the playoffs after some slip-ups during the regular season (a 9-8 start, a 5-game losing streak, and a not so favorable record against the best teams in the league). However, many pundits believed that the end of the season showed the Heat playing the best they had all season. Although the Sixers offered some resistance to the Heat, including some close games and a come from behind victory the Heat were able to take it in five and advance out of the first round for the first time since their NBA Championship in 2006.

(3) Boston Celtics vs. (6) New York Knicks

Regular-season series

This was the 14th playoff meeting between these two teams, with the Celtics winning seven of the first 13 meetings.

Due to the Celtics' struggles at the end of the regular season as well as the star power of the New York Knicks in Amar'e Stoudemire and Carmelo Anthony this was a favorite first round upset for many. In the first two games the Knicks were indeed able to show they could contend with the defending Eastern Conference champions. In Game 1, Ray Allen made a game winning three-pointer after being freed up by a controversial screen. The next two games the Celtics took fairly easily as injuries to both Chauncey Billups and Amar'e Stoudemire took their toll on the Knicks. This was the only sweep of the first round.

(4) Orlando Magic vs. (5) Atlanta Hawks

Regular-season series

This was the third playoff meeting between these two teams, with the Magic winning the first two meetings.

Despite having won the season series against the Magic the Atlanta Hawks were touted as underdogs against the Orlando Magic, led by Defensive Player of the Year Dwight Howard. In the first game of the series the Hawks were unable to contain Howard as he scored 46 points – however, by limiting the contributions of the Magic's role players they were able to get a victory and steal home court advantage from the Magic. Although the Magic won the next game, better play by the Hawks down the stretch and the inability of the Magic to convert on 3-point shots (the Magic shot 2-23 from beyond the arc in game 4) gave the Hawks a 3-1 lead. The next two games were split and the Hawks advanced to the Eastern Conference Semifinals for the third straight year.

Western Conference first round

(1) San Antonio Spurs vs. (8) Memphis Grizzlies

Regular-season series

This was the second playoff meeting between these two teams, with the Spurs winning the first meeting.

The eighth seeded Grizzlies won their first playoff game in franchise history after they defeated the top seeded Spurs 101-98 in Game 1. The Spurs evened the series up in Game 2, but the Grizzlies won Games 3 and 4 to take a 3-1 lead in the series. In Game 5 with only 1.7 seconds left in regulation, Gary Neal tied the game with a 3-point buzzer beater to force OT. The Spurs won in OT 110-103. In Game 6, the Grizzlies won their first ever playoff series in franchise history when they defeated the Spurs 99-91, winning the series 4-2. In addition, the Grizzlies became just the second eighth seeded team to knock off a top seeded team since the NBA went to a best-of-seven series in the first round.

(2) Los Angeles Lakers vs. (7) New Orleans Hornets

Regular-season series

This was the first playoff meeting between the Lakers and the New Orleans Pelicans/Hornets franchise.

(3) Dallas Mavericks vs. (6) Portland Trail Blazers

Regular-season series

This was the fourth playoff meeting between these two teams, with the Trail Blazers winning two of the first three meetings.

The Mavericks won the first two games of the series, but the Trail Blazers won Games 3 and 4 to tie the series 2-2. In Game 4, the Trail Blazers played from behind most of the game, at one point trailing the Mavericks by 23 points late in the third quarter. Entering the final quarter down 67-49, the Trail Blazers, with the help of Brandon Roy's 18 fourth quarter points, embarked on their biggest fourth quarter comeback in franchise history to win the game 84-82. However, the Mavericks recovered from their Game 4 collapse and won Games 5 and 6 to win the series 4-2.

(4) Oklahoma City Thunder vs. (5) Denver Nuggets

Regular-season series

This was the fourth playoff meeting between these two teams, with the Nuggets winning two of the first three meetings. All previous meetings took place while the Thunder franchise were still known as the Seattle SuperSonics.

Conference semifinals

Eastern Conference semifinals

(1) Chicago Bulls vs. (5) Atlanta Hawks

Regular-season series

This was the fifth playoff meeting between these two teams, with the each team winning two series apiece.

(2) Miami Heat vs. (3) Boston Celtics

Game 4 is Shaquille O'Neal's final NBA game.

Regular-season series

This was the second playoff meeting between these two teams, with the Celtics winning the first meeting.

The series was seen as a way for Heat small forward LeBron James to exact revenge on the Celtics after Boston eliminated James' former team the Cleveland Cavaliers in 2008 and 2010. James called the series "personal", saying "...You don't want to keeping getting beat by the same team, the same team keep sending you home to plan a vacation..."

The Heat won the first two games of the series to take a 2-0 lead. However, the Celtics cut the series lead in half by winning Game 3 97-81. In that game, Boston point guard Rajon Rondo dislocated his left elbow on a bizarre play where he became tangled up with Dwyane Wade.  Despite his injury, Rondo still contributed to the Celtics' victory with his 11 assists and 4 points in the fourth quarter, however his left arm was visibly limp the rest of the series and he was unable to play at his customarily high level.

Miami bounced back after the Game 3 loss and won Games 4 and 5, winning the series 4-1 and returning to their first Eastern Conference Finals since the 2006 NBA playoffs.

Western Conference semifinals

(2) Los Angeles Lakers vs. (3) Dallas Mavericks

Regular-season series

This was the fourth playoff meeting between these two teams, with the Lakers winning the first three meetings.

The Mavericks won the first two games of the series in Los Angeles, including overcoming a 16-point late third-quarter deficit in Game 1. The Mavericks then overcame another second-half deficit in Game 3 to win 98–92. In Game 4, the Mavericks blew out the Lakers 122–86, sweeping the two-time defending NBA champions from the playoffs. In that game, Dallas scored 20 three-pointers, equaling an NBA record. Mavericks sixth man Jason Terry led the team in scoring with 32 points while making 9 of his 10 3-point attempts, tying another NBA playoff record that would go unequaled for nearly five years. Also in the same game, Andrew Bynum was ejected and eventually fined and suspended for five games of the next season after he committed a flagrant foul on J. J. Barea.

This series was the first time a team coached by Phil Jackson was swept in the playoffs.

(4) Oklahoma City Thunder vs. (8) Memphis Grizzlies

Regular-season series

This was the first playoff meeting between the Grizzlies and the Thunder.

The Grizzlies and Thunder split the first 2 games of the series. In Game 3, the Grizzlies took a 2-1 series lead after overcoming a 16-point deficit late in the 3rd quarter. The Thunder tied the series in Game 4 after winning in triple OT 133-123. The Thunder blew out the Grizzlies in Game 5 99-72, but the Grizzlies tied the series at 3 when they defeated the Thunder 95-83 in Game 6. The Thunder finally advanced to their first conference finals since they moved from Seattle when they eliminated the Grizzlies 105-90 in Game 7. In that game, Russell Westbrook became the fifth player to record a triple double in a Game 7.

Conference finals

Eastern Conference finals

(1) Chicago Bulls vs. (2) Miami Heat

Regular-season series

This was the sixth playoff meeting between these two teams, with the Bulls winning four of the first five meetings.

Going into the series, Chicago had swept Miami in the regular season. The Bulls took Game 1 by blowing out the Heat 103-82. However, Miami won the next four consecutive games to win the series 4-1. In Game 5, Miami came back from a 12-point deficit with only three minutes left in the fourth quarter to win the game 83-80.

This series marked the first time the Bulls lost more than two consecutive games in the entire season.

Western Conference finals

(3) Dallas Mavericks vs. (4) Oklahoma City Thunder

Regular-season series

This was the third playoff meeting between these two teams, with each team winning one series apiece. All previous meetings took place while the Thunder franchise were still known as the Seattle SuperSonics.

In Game 1 of the Western Conference Finals, Dirk Nowitzki of the Dallas Mavericks set a playoff record for most free throws made without a miss with 24, previously held by Paul Pierce (21) in 2003. The Mavericks won 121-112. The Thunder and Mavericks then split the next two games. In Game 4, the Mavericks rallied from a 15-point deficit with only five minutes left in regulation to win the game in OT and take a 3-1 series lead. The Mavericks then overcame another late 4th quarter deficit in Game 5 to win the game 100-96 and the series 4-1 and reach their first finals since 2006. It would be the last time that neither the 1st seed or the 2nd seed reached the Conference Finals until 2020.

NBA Finals: (E2) Miami Heat vs. (W3) Dallas Mavericks

Regular-season series

This was the second playoff meeting between these two teams, with the Heat winning the first meeting.

Statistic leaders

References

External links

 2011 playoffs at NBA.com
 2011 NBA Playoffs at ESPN
 2011 NBA Playoffs at Basketball Reference

Playoffs
National Basketball Association playoffs
Sports in Portland, Oregon
ABS-CBN television specials

fi:NBA-kausi 2010–2011#Pudotuspelit